Horman is a surname. Notable people with the surname include:

 Arthur T. Horman (1905 – 1964), American screenwriter
 Charles Horman (1942–1973), journalist
 William Horman (c. 1440–1535), headmaster

See also
 Disappearance of Kyron Horman
 John Horman Trophy
 Sherry Hormann (born 1960), film director